Caltha natans is a species of flowering plant in the buttercup family. It goes by the common name floating marsh marigold.

Description
Caltha natans is an aquatic herbaceous perennial that is insect pollinated. Unlike other species of Caltha that are found in North America, C. natans shows relatively little morphological variation, and has not been divided into infraspecific taxa. Each flower forms 20–55 follicles, which contain black, elliptic seeds  in diameter.

Distribution
Caltha natans has an amphi-Beringian distribution, being found in both North America and East Asia. In Asia, it is found in Siberia, Mongolia and the Chinese provinces of Heilongjiang and Nei Mongol. In North America, it is found in Alaska, the Canadian provinces of British Columbia, North West Territories, Yukon, Saskatchewan Alberta, Manitoba and Ontario, and in a small part of the contiguous United States (in the states of Minnesota and Wisconsin).

In Minnesota it is list as a threatened species, it is generally rare or very localized throughout its native range in North America, It has only been found a few times south of the Canadian boarder and a number of these locations have been wiped out by habitat loss.

Habitat
Caltha natans is found growing in shallow, slow-moving streams and creeks, it is also found in pools, ditches, and along sheltered lake margins, swamps, and beaver ponds. The stems root at the nodes in mud, silt, or clay. It can be found growing in populations with a few scattered individuals, or as dense mats consisting of many plants. In Minnesota, C. natans has been found growing with other plants like  Glyceria spp. (manna grass), Carex spp. (sedges), Potamogeton spp. (pondweed), and Utricularia spp. (bladderwort).

References

External links

natans
Flora of Eastern Asia
Flora of Inner Mongolia
Flora of Manchuria
Flora of Siberia
Flora of North America
Plants described in 1776